Aspen Capital is a merchant bank in Portland, Oregon. The private merchant bank specializes in loan acquisitions, real estate financing & investment, distressed securities, and hospitality. Originally known as Aspen Capital Partners, the bank was once strictly focused on commercial real estate, but entered the residential property market in 2004 by offering loans to homeowners who were nearing foreclosure.

Financial crisis
The bank received a strong volume of publicity when housing prices dropped in 2007 and about 45 percent of loans from Aspen Capital fell into foreclosure. Although the company had little say in the housing market during this time, it is now primarily recognized again as a commercial real estate investor. The State of Oregon started an investigation of the lender in 2010 over allegations of violation of consumer protection laws.

See also
 List of companies based in Oregon

References

Banks based in Oregon
American companies established in 1987
Banks established in 1987
Companies based in Portland, Oregon
1987 establishments in Oregon